Santa Elena is a district of the La Cruz canton, in the Guanacaste province of Costa Rica.

Geography 
Santa Elena has an area of  km² and an elevation of  metres.

Villages
Administrative center of the district is the village of Cuajiniquil.

Other villages in the district are Cedros, Guaria, Puerto Castilla and Rabo de Mico (Aguacaliente).

Demographics 

For the 2011 census, Santa Elena had a population of  inhabitants.

Transportation

Road transportation 
The district is covered by the following road routes:
 National Route 1
 National Route 913
 National Route 914
 National Route 937

References 

Districts of Guanacaste Province
Populated places in Guanacaste Province